Mitzou is a Greek surname. Notable people with the surname include:

Georgios Mitzou (died 1869), Greek revolutionary leader 
Petros Mitzou (died 1825), Greek revolutionary leader 

Greek-language surnames